Black Sands is an Icelandic crime-drama television series created by Aldís Amah Hamilton, Andri Óttarsson, and Ragnar Jónsson. It is directed by Baldvin Zophoníasson. The show premiered on Stöð 2 on 25 December 2021.

Synopsis
The series focuses on Aníta Elínardóttir, a thirty-year-old policewoman who takes a job in her childhood home, the only position she can get after being forced to resign in Reykjavik. She has not been to the village in fourteen years, and in the meantime, it has become a tourist trap, surrounded by black sand. Worst of all, she has to move in with her mother, Elín, with whom she has a broken relationship due to a difficult past.

When Aníta arrives in town, the body of a young woman is found on the sandy beach. She seems to have fallen from the overhanging cliff. An investigation begins, led by police chief Ragnar, village doctor Solómon, and the local police team. Nothing criminal seems to have taken place, until a friend of the deceased is found later that night, battered and covered in blood. 

As the investigation dwindles, Aníta ends up at the centre of a fiery love triangle that complicates things for her. It turns out that the local police have not been properly carrying out investigations, and there are possible links with other cases. A showdown with her mother is inevitable. Aníta gets sucked into the search for a potential mass murderer, and the showdown turns into a nightmare.

Cast and characters
 Aldís Amah Hamilton as Aníta Elínardóttir
 Þór Tulinius as Ragnar
 Steinunn Ólína Þorsteinsdóttir as Elín
 Ævar Þór Benediktsson as Gústi
 Kolbeinn Arnbjörnsson as Salómon Túlinius
 Lára Jóhanna Jónsdóttir as Fríða Melsteð
 Aron Már Ólafsson as Tómas

Episodes

Series 1 (2021)

References

External links
 

Icelandic-language television shows
2020s Icelandic television series
Crime television series
Icelandic drama television series
Television shows set in Iceland
Stöð 2 original programming